Dalbergia urschii is a species of legume in the family Fabaceae. It is found only in Madagascar.

The ICUN labels this species as threatened by habitat loss.

References

Sources
 

urschii
Endemic flora of Madagascar
Endangered plants
Taxonomy articles created by Polbot